Edgar Eno was a member of the Wisconsin State Assembly.

Biography
Eno was born on September 25, 1841 in Bloomfield, Connecticut. During the American Civil War, he was a member of the 12th Wisconsin Volunteer Infantry Regiment of the Union Army. He would serve during the Vicksburg Campaign, the Atlanta Campaign and the Carolinas Campaign.

Political career
Eno was a member of the Assembly during the 1874 and 1891 sessions. He was a Republican.

References

People from Bloomfield, Connecticut
People from Vernon County, Wisconsin
Republican Party members of the Wisconsin State Assembly
People of Wisconsin in the American Civil War
Union Army soldiers
1841 births
Year of death missing